Christian Tommasini (born 14 March 1998) is an Italian professional footballer who plays as a forward for  club Taranto on loan from Pisa.

Club career
Tommasini was transferred as a youth to Sampdoria from Cesena. He was loaned to Serie D club Mezzolara for the 2017–18 season.

On 28 July 2018, Tommasini was transferred to Serie C club Pontedera where he spent three seasons. 

On 24 January 2021 the forward joined Pisa, and was immediately loaned to Imolese.

On 28 July 2021, he joined to Fiorenzuola on loan.

On 21 January 2022, he went to Paganese on loan.

References

External links
 
 

1998 births
Living people
People from Castel San Pietro Terme
Footballers from Emilia-Romagna
Italian footballers
Association football forwards
Serie C players
Serie D players
A.C. Cesena players
U.C. Sampdoria players
A.S.D. Mezzolara players
U.S. Città di Pontedera players
Pisa S.C. players
Imolese Calcio 1919 players
U.S. Fiorenzuola 1922 S.S. players
Paganese Calcio 1926 players
Taranto F.C. 1927 players
Sportspeople from the Metropolitan City of Bologna